Hubert Krains (1862–1934) was a Belgian author.

Life
Born in Brussels, Krains became a member of the Académie royale de langue et de littérature françaises de Belgique. He wrote essays and became famous with Portraits d'écrivains belges (1930), a collection of essays on Belgian writers. Krains died in a train accident. A prize is named in his honour.

Works
 "Le pain noir" – short story anthologized in À la gloire de la Belgique, edited by Jan Greshoff (1915), pp. 237–241. (Available on dbnl.org)

Honours 
 1924: Commander in the Order of the Crown.

References

1862 births
1934 deaths
19th-century Belgian writers
20th-century Belgian writers
Commanders of the Order of the Crown (Belgium)
Members of the Académie royale de langue et de littérature françaises de Belgique